Reidar Carlsson  (born 1957) is a Swedish journalist and politician. He is a member of the Centre Party.

References

 Norrtejle Tidnings av Reidar Carlsson signerade ledarartiklar
 Radiointervju med Reidar Carlsson

Swedish journalists
Centre Party (Sweden) politicians
1957 births
Living people